Shirley Patterson, sometimes billed as Shawn Smith, (December 26, 1922 – April 4, 1995) was a Canadian-born B-movie actress of the 1940s and 1950s.

Early years 
Born in Winnipeg, Canada, Patterson grew up in Eastend, Saskatchewan. She was the daughter of druggist Benjamin Patterson. The family moved to Los Angeles because of her father's health problems, and she finished her education there.

Career 
Patterson began her acting career after being a beauty contestant in pageants in California from 1939 to 1940. In 1940, she won the Miss California Pageant but was disqualified later when it was found she was underage. The second-place contestant (Rosemary LaPlanche) won the Miss America Pageant in 1941.

She signed a contract with Columbia Pictures after a talent scout saw her perform in a little theater production. Her career spanned 40 films, a few television appearances, and a serial.

Patterson played the role of heroine, Linda Page, in the 1943 15-chapter Batman serial. In 1944, she starred in The Vigilantes Ride with Russell Hayden and Bob Wills. In 1946, she accompanied Eddie Dean and Roscoe Ates in the movie Driftin River, and starred with them again the same year in Tumbleweed Trail, as well as Stars Over Texas. She also was Dean's object of affection in the song "Let's Go Sparkin'" from the 1947 movie Black Hills. 

 Patterson played Poppea, Nero's consort, in a nonspeaking role in The Silver Chalice (1954). Two of her last films were the 1957 movie The Land Unknown and the 1958 science-fiction movie It! The Terror from Beyond Space. Shortly after the close of filming in 1958 while skiing at Lake Arrowhead, California, she suffered a severely broken leg. She was in a full leg cast for a year and then a half cast for another six months, effectively ending her acting career.

Personal life 
She had one child, Alfred F. Smith III (nickname,”Tory”). Patterson was married to Alfred F. Smith Jr.

Death 
Patterson had a long fight with cancer in her later years and died in 1995 in Fort Lauderdale, Florida. Her ashes were scattered in the Pacific Ocean.

Filmography

References

External links

 
 
 Shirley Patterson at b-westerns.com

1922 births
1995 deaths
20th-century American actresses
Actresses from Winnipeg
American film actresses
American television actresses
Canadian emigrants to the United States
Canadian film actresses
Canadian television actresses
Deaths from cancer in Florida